Sir Bernard Hugh Denman Croft,  13th Baronet Croft of Croft Castle (born 24 August 1903) was a rugby union player who represented Australia.

Croft, a wing, was born in Hobart, Tasmania and claimed 1 international rugby cap for Australia.

References

Australian rugby union players
Australia international rugby union players
1903 births
Year of death missing
Rugby union players from Hobart
Rugby union wings